A by-election was held for the New South Wales Legislative Assembly electorate of Auburn on 2 October 1943. following the resignation of Jack Lang who had resigned to unsuccessfully contest the seat of Reid at the 1943 Australian federal election. Having failed to enter federal politics, he contested and won the by-election for his state seat.

Results

		

Jack Lang resigned to unsuccessfully contest the seat of Reid at the 1943 Australian federal election.

See also
Electoral results for the district of Auburn
List of New South Wales state by-elections

References

1943 elections in Australia
New South Wales state by-elections
1940s in New South Wales
October 1943 events